The JCMS: Journal of Common Market Studies is a bimonthly peer-reviewed academic journal covering the politics and economics of European integration, focusing principally on developments within the European Union, European politics more broadly and comparative regionalism (politics). It was established in 1962 and is published by John Wiley & Sons on behalf of UACES (the Academic Association for Contemporary European Studies). The editors-in-chief are Toni Haastrup (University of Stirling) and Richard Whitman (University of Kent) and the co-editors are Heather MacRae (York University), Annick Masselot (University of Canterbury), Mills Soko (University of Witwatersrand) and Alasdair R. Young (Georgia Institute of Technology).

Abstracting and indexing 
The journal is abstracted and indexed in:

According to the Journal Citation Reports, the journal has a 2020 impact factor of 3.990, ranking it 29th out of 183 journals in the category "Political Science", 12th out of 95 journals in the category "International Relations" and 64th out of 378 journals in the category "Economics".

See also 
 List of political science journals
 List of international relations journals
 List of economics journals

References

External links 
 
 UACES

English-language journals
European studies journals
Publications established in 1962
Bimonthly journals
Wiley (publisher) academic journals